Sun Yafang (born 1955)  is a Chinese engineer and business executive. She is the longest serving Chairwoman of Huawei, a position she held  from 1999 to 2018. As of 2016, she is listed as the 38th most powerful woman in the world by Forbes.

Background 
She earned her bachelor's degree at the University of Electronic Science and Technology of China (UESTC) in 1982.  Then, Sun started working as a technician at Xin Fei TV Manufactory.  In 1985, she became an engineer at the Beijing Research Institution of Communication Technology.  She began her career with Huawei in 1989 and became chairwoman of the corporation in 1999.

A 2011 report by the CIA's Open Source Center stated Sun worked for the Ministry of State Security of the People's Republic of China and linked her to the Chinese military.

In March 2018, Sun Yafang stepped down as Chairwoman of Huawei after nineteen years and was replaced by Liang Hua.

Awards
In May 2012, she received the World Telecommunication and Information Society Award from the International Telecommunication Union. As of 2014, she is listed as the 81st most powerful woman in the world by Forbes.

See also
Meng Wanzhou, Deputy Chairwoman & CFO of Huawei

References

External links

Living people
1955 births
Huawei people
Chinese women business executives
Chinese women engineers
Engineers from Guizhou
20th-century Chinese businesswomen
20th-century Chinese businesspeople
21st-century Chinese businesswomen
21st-century Chinese businesspeople
University of Electronic Science and Technology of China alumni